Gallaway may refer to:

Places
United States
 Gallaway, Tennessee

Other uses
 Gallaway (surname)

See also
Galloway